Alan H. Fishman (born 16 March 1946) is an American businessman. He was notably the last CEO of Washington Mutual (WaMu) prior to its assets being seized by federal regulators on September 25, 2008.

Education and Career 

Fishman holds a bachelor's degree from Brown University and a master's degree in economics from Columbia University. He was previously president and chief operating officer of Sovereign Bank and president and chief executive officer of Independence Community Bank. He has served as chairman of Meridian Capital Group (beginning in 2007), one of the nation's largest commercial mortgage brokerage firms. He has been a private equity investor, focusing on financial services at Neuberger & Berman, Adler & Shaykin and at his own firm Columbia Financial Partners. In addition, he held senior executive positions at Chemical Bank and ContiFinancial Corporation.

Fishman was Chairman of the Board of Trustees of Brooklyn Academy of Music, on which he served for nearly thirty years, until January 2017.

Washington Mutual 

Fishman joined WaMu on 8 September 2008, replacing outgoing CEO Kerry Killinger as part of that bank's restructuring in the face of the subprime mortgage crisis of 2008. He served as the bank's CEO for 17 days before its banking assets were seized by federal regulators in the largest bank failure in American history. WaMu's banking operations were sold to JPMorgan Chase for $1.9 billion, while the remainder of WaMu declared bankruptcy the next day. According to C-Span on 26 September 2008, Alan H. Fishman was ultimately paid $19 million for three weeks of being with Washington Mutual, including severance pay. Meanwhile, the company's stock price dwindled to only pennies after trading as high as $45 a share in 2007.  The previous CEO was paid $14 million for one year on the job.

References

Brown University alumni
Columbia Graduate School of Arts and Sciences alumni
Living people
1960 births
American chief operating officers
American chief executives of financial services companies
20th-century American businesspeople